Timiskaming is a district and census division in Northeastern Ontario in the Canadian province of Ontario. The district was created in 1912 from parts of Algoma, Nipissing, and Sudbury districts. In 1921, Cochrane District was created from parts of this district and parts of Thunder Bay District.

The division had a population of 32,251 in the Canada 2016 Census.

It is just west of the similarly named Témiscamingue county in Québec, which is also informally called a region, but is administratively part of a greater region named Abitibi-Témiscamingue.

Temiskaming District is home to several provincial parks.

History
The coureurs de bois explored and traded fur in what is now the Timiskaming District, in the 17th century.

Subdivisions

City
 Temiskaming Shores (Haileybury, New Liskeard, Dymond Township, North Cobalt)

Towns
 Cobalt 
 Englehart
 Kirkland Lake (Chaput Hughes, Swastika)
 Latchford

Townships
 Armstrong (Earlton)
 Brethour 
 Casey (Belle Vallée)
 Chamberlain
 Charlton and Dack
 Coleman  
 Evanturel
 Gauthier (Dobie)
 Harley 
 Harris 
 Hilliard (Hilliardton)
 Hudson 
 James (Elk Lake)
 Kerns 
 Larder Lake 
 Matachewan
 McGarry (Kearns, Virginiatown)

Village
 Thornloe

First Nations reserve
 Matachewan 72

Unorganized areas
 Timiskaming, Unorganized, East Part
 Timiskaming, Unorganized, West Part (Gowganda, Kenabeek, King Kirkland, Marshall's Corners, Marter, Sesekinika, Tarzwell, Tomstown)

The following local services boards serve inhabitants of these unincorporated areas:

Kenogami
King-Lebel
Maisonville
Savard

Geographical townships

Alma	
Argyle	
Armstrong
Arnold  
Auld  	
Baden  
Banks  
Bannockburn  	
Barber  
Barr  	
Bartlett  	
Bayly 
Beauchamp   	
Bernhardt 
Blain 
Bompas 	
Boston  	
Brethour
Brewster  	
Brigstocke  	
Bryce  
Bucke  	
Burt 	
Cairo
Cane 
Casey	
Catharine 
Chamberlain 	
Charters 
Childerhose
Chown  	
Cleaver 	
Cole 
Coleman 
Corkill 	
Corley 
Dack  
Dane  	
Davidson  
Donovan  	
Doon 	
Douglas  
Doyle  
Dufferin  	
Dunmore  
Dymond  	
Eby  	
Evanturel 
Fallon  	

Farr  	
Fasken  
Firstbrook  	
Flavelle  	
Fripp  
Gamble 
Gauthier   	
Geikie  
Gillies Limit  
Grenfell  	
Gross 
Harley 	
Harris 	
Haultain 
Hearst	
Henwood   	
Hillary  
Hilliard 	
Hincks  
Holmes 
Hudson 	
Ingram  	
James
Katrine
Kerns  	
Kimberley 
Kittson 	
Klock  	
Knight 
Lawson 	
Lebel 	
Leckie 
Lee 	
Leith 	
Leo
Leonard  	
Lorrain  	
Lundy 
Maisonville 	
Marquis  	
Marter
McArthur	
McElroy 	
McFadden 
McGarry 	
McGiffin	
McKeown 
McNeil  	
McVittie	

Medina 
Michie 	
Mickle 	
Midlothian
Milner	
Montrose 	
Morel 
Morrisette	
Mulligan 	
Musgrove 
Nicol 	
Nordica 
North Williams 
Ossian	
Otto 	
Pacaud 
Pense 	
Pharand 	
Powell 
Rankin 	
Rattray 
Ray
Raymond
Reynolds 	
Roadhouse 
Robertson  	
Robillard 
Rorke 
Savard 	
Sharpe	
Sheba 
Shillington	
Skead 	
Smyth 
South Lorrain
Speight 	
Teck 
Terry
Trethewey  	
Truax 
Tudhope
Tyrrell 
Van Hise 
van Nostrand 
Wallis 	
Whitson 
Willet
Willison  	
Yarrow

Demographics

Politics
The district seat is in Temiskaming Shores.

Along with portions of the neighbouring district, Cochrane, Timiskaming is represented in the Legislative Assembly of Ontario by John Vanthof. In the House of Commons of Canada, the district is divided between Nipissing—Timiskaming, represented by Anthony Rota, in the south, and Timmins—James Bay, represented by Charlie Angus, in the north. A very small portion of the district also belongs to the riding of Nickel Belt.

See also
List of townships in Ontario
List of secondary schools in Ontario#Timiskaming District

References

External links

Tembrella.com
Ontario Highway 11 Homepage - Timiskaming District (community profiles)
Map of historic geographic townships in Timiskaming District
Timiskaming Community Health Network